Paula-Irmeli Halonen (born 22 August 1945) is a Finnish speed skater. She competed in three events at the 1976 Winter Olympics.

References

External links
 

1945 births
Living people
Finnish female speed skaters
Olympic speed skaters of Finland
Speed skaters at the 1976 Winter Olympics
People from Varkaus
Sportspeople from North Savo